Gatos de Madrid were a rugby union franchise from Community of Madrid (Spain), which took part representing this community at  Liga Superibérica.

The team was established in 2009, and was born incorporating, at the beginning, the four top-grade Madrid clubs: Club Alcobendas Rugby which took part at the División de Honor and the  División de Honor B participants: CRC Madrid, Complutense Cisneros and C.R Liceo Francés, although its intention would have been to involve all the Madrid clubs in the project, in a future.

The team's home stadia, are the different stadiums of the constituent clubs of the franchise: Estadio de Las Terrazas in Alcobendas, Stade Ramón Urtubi and Campo Central de Ciudad Universitaria in Madrid; which are all located in the Community of Madrid.

Canterbury of New Zealand supplied the kits for the franchise, likewise for the other five participants.

Name and emblem 
The name and emblem of the franchise were elected after a  popular contest, where the moniker Gatos (Cats) was chosen due to being an appellative of everyone born in Madrid, with four Madrilenian grandparents. Moreover, another account recounts that said moniker harkened back to the War of Independence in 1808, against the French, where following the 2 May uprising, the inhabitants of  Madrid fought in the roofs like cats.

Eventually, the franchise's badge was a yellow cat eye with a black oval, representing a rugby ball.

History 
Gatos de Madrid debuted in official competition on 26 April 2009 against the Andalucian franchise Sevilla F.C Andalucía, at Campo de las Terrazas in Alcobendas with a 31-14 win. On 5 July 2009, Gatos won the first edition of Liga Superibérica after a 28 draw against Mariners and winning by try difference.

Honours 

 1 Liga Superibérica: 2009

References

See also 
 Liga Superibérica

Sport in Alcobendas
Spanish rugby union teams